Colossus is a steel roller coaster at Thorpe Park in Surrey, England, and the park's first major attraction. It was built by Swiss manufacturers Intamin and designed by Werner Stengel as an adaptation of Monte Makaya in Brazil. Colossus was the world's first roller coaster with ten inversions; an exact replica, called the 10 Inversion Roller Coaster, was later built at Chimelong Paradise in Guangzhou, China. It retained its title of having the most inversions on any other roller coaster in the world until The Smiler at Alton Towers took the record in 2013.

Manufacturer Intamin used a similar train style to their Mega Coaster models, which are exposed by removing the sides of the train. This caused problems as riders could lift their legs outside of the train whilst it was in motion. For a brief period in 2002 and 2003 the ride was equipped with metal bars on the sides of the train to prevent this. During 2003 the trains were fitted with new style restraints to prevent riders from doing this and the metal plates were removed.

The roller coaster is located in the Lost City area, in the south-east of the park. The ride is formed of a vertical loop, a cobra roll, two corkscrews and five heartline rolls. The ride's rough theme is the ruins of a recently unearthed Atlantean civilization. The music for the ride and surrounding area was composed by Ian Habgood. During planning and construction, Colossus was known as Project Odyssey.

Ride experience

Inversions

The ride

The train is dispatched from the station and immediately begins to ascend the chain lift hill, bringing riders to a maximum height of 98 ft. After disengaging from the chain, the train follows a 180 degree turn to the left into a drop - and passes through a vertical loop (left). The train then briefly traverses an elongated airtime hill that drops beneath the ride exit and gift shop creating a "head-chopper effect", before pulling sharply upwards into a cobra roll situated in a partially flooded pit (so as to allow other guests to observe the element and generate a more engaging visual spectacle to surround the attraction).

Upon exiting the cobra roll, the second phase of the circuit begins: snaking slightly to the left, the train is quickly pulled through two corkscrew elements; the first inverting riders over the airtime hill and the second encompassing a pathway leading to the ride entrance. Riders' photographs are taken as the train levels after the second corkscrew. Here, the speed of the train decreases rapidly. Riders then experience four consecutive clockwise heartline rolls that pass only 10 ft above the area's pathway. A final bend round to the left is completed as the train slowly approaches the station, before an unexpected final inversion (a counter-clockwise heartline roll). The train then slows into the final brake run, stopping for a moment before the exit.

References

External links

Thorpe Park – official website
Colossus at Thorpe Park Mania – official fansite

Roller coasters operated by Merlin Entertainments
Roller coasters in the United Kingdom
Roller coasters introduced in 2002
Thorpe Park roller coasters
2002 establishments in England